The Long Island Bank was the first bank in Brooklyn, New York.

History

In the early 1820s, Brooklyn was the 16th largest inhabited place in the United States; however, Brooklyn had no bank and no insurance company.

In 1824, the bank was incorporated and became the first bank in Brooklyn. The initial capital of the bank was $300,000 in $50 shares. Bank notes were issued from 3 August 1824. Its offices were at 7 Front Street in Brooklyn. The first President was Leffert Lefferts.

In 1867, William S. Herriman, president of the bank, died and was replaced by William C. Fowler.

References

Banks based in New York (state)
Banks established in 1824
History of Brooklyn
1824 establishments in New York (state)
American companies established in 1824